HMS Unique was a U-class submarine of the Royal Navy, of the second group of that class, built by Vickers Armstrong, Barrow-in-Furness. She was laid down on 30 October 1939 and was commissioned on 27 September 1940.

Career 
She spent most of her career operating in the Mediterranean from mid 1941 under the command of Captain Arthur Hezlet, where she sank the Italian passenger/cargo ship Fenicia and the Italian troop transport Esperia. She also damaged the Italian cargo ship Arsia, which was later declared a total loss.

Sinking 

Unique left Holy Loch after a refit, for a patrol in the Bay of Biscay on 7 October 1942. She left her escort off the Scillies on 9 October. No more was seen or heard from her after that date.  was in the area on 10 October and reported hearing underwater explosions that led her to believe Unique was under attack, although the Germans made no claims of her sinking. She was reported overdue on 24 October 1942 when she failed to arrive at Gibraltar.

References 

 
 

 

British U-class submarines
Ships built in Barrow-in-Furness
1940 ships
World War II submarines of the United Kingdom
Lost submarines of the United Kingdom
Missing submarines of World War II
Ships lost with all hands
Maritime incidents in October 1942